Kitumbeine is an administrative ward in the Monduli district of the Arusha Region of Tanzania. According to the 2002 census, the ward has a total population of 13,629.

Electrification
Prior to 2016, the residents of Kitumbeine had no access to reliable electricity. This changed when one of Mini-Grid developers in Tanzania electrified the village fueling socio-economic growth in the village.

The move is in line with the government initiative to ensure energy access and connectivity to all citizen following the opt-in to the SE4ALL goals.

References

Wards of Longido
Wards of Arusha Region